Phragmatobia is a genus of moths in the subfamily Arctiinae described by James Francis Stephens in 1828. Many tiger-moth species of small and medium size were described within this genus. However, only a few are related to the type species.

Species
 Phragmatobia amurensis Seitz, 1910
 Phragmatobia assimilans Walker, 1855
 Phragmatobia fuliginosa (Linnaeus, 1758)
 Phragmatobia lineata Newman & Donahue, 1966
 Phragmatobia placida (Frivaldszky, 1835)

All other species were separated into different genera, or still remain in Phragmatobia and wait for reviewers:

 Phragmatobia coelestina Püngeler, 1904 - in Orontobia
 Phragmatobia fervida (Walker, 1855) - in Sonorarctia
 Phragmatobia flavata (Hampson, 1901)
 Phragmatobia flavescens (Rothschild, 1933) - in Andesobia
 Phragmatobia fumipennis Hampson, 1891 - in Bucaea
 Phragmatobia hodeva (Druce, 1897) - in Allanwatsonia
 Phragmatobia karsholti Toulgoët, 1991
 Phragmatobia luctifera [Denis & Schiffermüller], 1775 - in Epatolmis
 Phragmatobia modesta Maassen, 1890 - in Amastus
 Phragmatobia nundar Dyar, 1907 - in Sonorarctia
 Phragmatobia oberthueri Rothschild, 1910 - in Lymantriidae
 Phragmatobia parvula (Felder, 1874) - in Pseudophragmatobia
 Phragmatobia sanguinea (Hampson, 1907)
 Phragmatobia thursbyi (Rothschild, 1910)

References

Spilosomina
Moth genera
Taxa named by James Francis Stephens